The Wicked Lady is the soundtrack to the 1983 remake of the film of the same title. It was composed by Genesis keyboardist Tony Banks. The first side of the LP features Banks performing solo versions of themes from the soundtrack. The second side of the LP is the actual soundtrack performed by the National Philharmonic Orchestra. For many years this had been the only entire solo LP by a Genesis member never to have been released on CD. However, a CD version was released on April 15, 2013.

Reception

In their retrospective review, AllMusic favorably compared the Banks solo half of the album to the instrumentals from A Curious Feeling. They praised the second half for being "more complex and dramatic", but admitted that it would be of little interest to most Genesis fans. They also complimented the format of having the songs rendered in both solo and orchestral versions: "Often switching between minor and major keys within songs, Banks has always shown a proclivity to classical stylings which helps the transitions of his pieces here to their orchestral versions."

Track listings

LP
Side 1 (performed by Tony Banks)
 "The Wicked Lady" – 3:34
 "Spring" – 2:38
 "The Chase" – 3:30
 "Caroline" – 3:11
 "Jerry Jackson" – 2:30
 "Repentance" – 2:10
 "Kit" – 3:06
 "Barbara" – 4:50

Side 2 (performed by the National Philharmonic Orchestra)
 "Prelude to The Wicked Lady" – 4:05
 "Portrait of Jerry Jackson" – 4:59
 "Caroline's Theme" – 3:06
 "Scherzo" – 2:44
 "Pastorale" – 4:02
 "The Wicked Lady" – 3:45
 "Kit's Theme" – 3:14
 "Finale" – 2:06

CD
Music from the film by National Philharmonic Orchestra

Variations on themes from The Wicked Lady by Tony Banks

Musicians
 Side one (LP) played by Tony Banks, recorded at home on 8 track. Mixed at The Farm, Surrey, with help from Steven Short and Geoff Callingham.
 Side two (LP) consists of orchestrated versions played by the National Philharmonic Orchestra of London (leader Sidney Sax), recorded at St. Peter's Church, Morden. Musical arrangements and orchestration by Christopher Palmer. Engineer: Tony Faulkner.

References

Tony Banks (musician) albums
Albums produced by Tony Banks (musician)
1983 soundtrack albums
Drama film soundtracks
Atlantic Records soundtracks